Elections to Omagh District Council were held on 19 May 1993 on the same day as the other Northern Irish local government elections. The election used three district electoral areas to elect a total of 21 councillors.

Election results

Note: "Votes" are the first preference votes.

Districts summary

|- class="unsortable" align="centre"
!rowspan=2 align="left"|Ward
! % 
!Cllrs
! % 
!Cllrs
! %
!Cllrs
! %
!Cllrs
! % 
!Cllrs
! %
!Cllrs
!rowspan=2|TotalCllrs
|- class="unsortable" align="center"
!colspan=2 bgcolor="" | Sinn Féin
!colspan=2 bgcolor="" | SDLP
!colspan=2 bgcolor="" | UUP
!colspan=2 bgcolor="" | DUP
!colspan=2 bgcolor="" | Alliance
!colspan=2 bgcolor="white"| Others
|-
|align="left"|Mid Tyrone
|bgcolor="#008800"|38.4
|bgcolor="#008800"|3
|18.7
|1
|16.9
|1
|10.6
|1
|1.8
|0
|13.6
|1
|7
|-
|align="left"|Omagh Town
|12.0
|1
|bgcolor="#99FF66"|25.1
|bgcolor="#99FF66"|2
|16.1
|1
|20.6
|1
|11.6
|1
|14.6
|1
|7
|-
|align="left"|West Tyrone
|20.9
|2
|bgcolor="#99FF66"|29.8
|bgcolor="#99FF66"|2
|26.6
|2
|15.6
|1
|2.3
|0
|4.8
|0
|7
|-
|- class="unsortable" class="sortbottom" style="background:#C9C9C9"
|align="left"| Total
|24.3
|6
|24.5
|5
|20.0
|4
|15.4
|3
|5.0
|1
|10.8
|2
|21
|-
|}

District results

Mid Tyrone

1989: 3 x Sinn Féin, 2 x UUP, 1 x SDLP, 1 x Independent Nationalist
1993: 3 x Sinn Féin, 1 x UUP, 1 x SDLP, 1 x DUP, 1 x Independent Nationalist
1989-1993 Change: DUP gain from UUP

Omagh Town

1989: 3 x SDLP, 2 x DUP, 1 x UUP, 1 x Sinn Féin
1993: 2 x SDLP, 1 x DUP, 1 x UUP, 1 x Sinn Féin, 1 x Alliance, 1 x Independent Labour
1989-1993 Change: Alliance gain from DUP, Independent Labour leaves SDLP

West Tyrone

1989: 2 x SDLP, 2 x UUP, 2 x Sinn Féin, 1 x DUP
1993: 2 x SDLP, 2 x UUP, 2 x Sinn Féin, 1 x DUP
1989-1993 Change: No change

References

Omagh District Council elections
Omagh